Iris reticulata, the netted iris or golden netted iris, is a species of flowering plant in the family Iridaceae. It is native from eastern Turkey to Iran, but cultivated widely in temperate regions. The reticulata group of irises is characterised by a fibrous net surrounding the bulb. They are hardy, but prefer a well-drained sunny position in soil which dries out in summer; they are therefore suitable for a rock or gravel garden.

The following cultivars have received the Royal Horticultural Society's Award of Garden Merit:
'George' (purple)
'Katharine Hodgkin' (pale blue)
'Pixie' (deep blue)

There is a known variety called Iris reticulata var. bakeriana (also known as Iris bakeriana).

References

reticulata
Plants described in 1808